Isidoro Carlos Ibarra (born 2 October 1992) is an Argentine field hockey player who plays as a defender or midfielder for San Fernando and the Argentine national team.

He has played 51 caps for the Argentine national team. He competed in the field hockey competition at the 2016 Summer Olympics, where he won the gold medal.

Club career
Ibarra played for San Fernando in Argentina and then for Royal Beerschot in Belgium until 2017 when he transferred to another Belgian club, Leuven. In 2018 he returned to San Fernando. After one season in Argentina, he went back to Belgium to play for Royal Antwerp.

References

External links

Living people
1992 births
Argentine people of Basque descent
Argentine male field hockey players
Male field hockey defenders
Male field hockey midfielders
Olympic field hockey players of Argentina
Field hockey players at the 2015 Pan American Games
Field hockey players at the 2016 Summer Olympics
Olympic gold medalists for Argentina
Medalists at the 2016 Summer Olympics
Olympic medalists in field hockey
Pan American Games gold medalists for Argentina
Pan American Games medalists in field hockey
Men's Belgian Hockey League players
Royal Beerschot THC players
KHC Leuven players
Medalists at the 2015 Pan American Games
Sportspeople from Buenos Aires Province